|- style="vertical-align: top;"
| Galactic coordinates 
| 260.3841 −03.4718 

RX J0822−4300, often referred to as a "Cosmic Cannonball", is a radio-quiet neutron star currently moving away from the center of the Puppis A supernova remnant at over 3 million miles per hour (5 400 000 km/h; 1500 km/s; ~0.5% the speed of light), making it one of the fastest moving stars ever found. Astronomers used NASA's Chandra X-ray Observatory to observe the star over a period of five years to determine its speed. At this velocity the star will be ejected from the galaxy millions of years from now.

Although the cosmic cannonball is not the only hypervelocity star discovered, it is unique in the apparent origin of its speed. Others may have derived theirs from a gravitational slingshot around the Milky Way's suspected supermassive black hole, Sagittarius A*. Current theories fail to explain how such speeds can be attained from a supernova explosion. It could be a possible quark star.

However, a more recent (2012) analysis by the same group yielded a more modest recoil velocity of 672±115 km/s which is much less problematic theoretically.

See also
 Puppis A or SNR 260.4−3.4

References

 "Cosmic Canonball: One Of The Fastest Stars Ever Seen Challenges Astronomy Theories", ScienceDaily, (2007)
 "Chandra Discovers a Cosmic Cannonball", Science@NASA (10.28.2007)
 Chandra X-Ray Observatory, "RX J0822-4300 in Puppis A: Chandra Discovers Cosmic Cannonball", 2007 November 28
 https://web.archive.org/web/20071205023347/http://www.unesp.br/universofisico/semanario.php?date=2006-08-14
 

Radio-quiet neutron stars
06.5
Hypervelocity stars
Puppis
ROSAT objects